The General Electric T58 is an American turboshaft engine developed for helicopter use. First run in 1955, it remained in production until 1984, by which time some 6,300 units had been built. On July 1, 1959, it became the first turbine engine to gain FAA certification for civil helicopter use. The engine was license-built and further developed by de Havilland in the UK as the Gnome, in the West Germany by Klöckner-Humboldt-Deutz, and also manufactured by Alfa Romeo and the IHI Corporation.

Design and development
Development commenced with a 1953 US Navy requirement for a helicopter turboshaft to weigh under 400 lb (180 kg) while delivering 800 hp (600 kW). The engine General Electric eventually built weighed only 250 lb (110 kg) and delivered 1,050 hp (780 kW) and was soon ordered into production. First flight was on a modified Sikorsky HSS-1 in 1957, and civil certification for the CT58-100 variant was obtained two years later.

A number of unusual features are incorporated into the T58:

 an all-axial compressor. Most other turboshafts in this power bracket have a  centrifugal unit as a final compressor stage. As a result, the blades at the rear of the compressor are very small (less than 0.5in high) and extremely thin.
 compressor handling at part speed is facilitated by several rows of variable stators at the front part of the unit. This was a fairly novel feature when the engine was first introduced.
 a single stage power turbine. which delivers power to the rear of the engine. The hot exhaust stream is diverted sideways, away from the output shaft.
 the combustor is a straight-through annular design, rather than reverse flow.

The main production version of the engine was the T58-GE-10, developing 1,400 hp (1,044 kW).  The most powerful version, the T58-GE-16, produces 1,870 hp (1,390 kW).

Variants

T58-GE-1
T58-GE-2
T58-GE-3 
T58-GE-4
T58-GE-5 
T58-GE-6
T58-GE-8B
T58-GE-8E
T58-GE-8F
T58-GE-10
T58-GE-14 2-stage power turbine
T58-GE-16
T58-GE-100 
T58-GE-402
CT58-100-1
CT58-110-1
CT58-140-1 commercial T58-GE-10
Ishikawajima-Harima CT58-IHI-110-1
Ishikawajima-Harima CT58-IHI-140-1
Ishikawajima-Harima T58-IHI-8B BLCFor Shin Meiwa PS-1 BLC system
Rolls-Royce GnomeLicensed production and development of the T58 in the United Kingdom.

Applications

Other
Two T58s, converted to turbojets by the removal of the power turbines, were used as the engines on the Maverick TwinJet 1200.

The Carroll Shelby turbine cars entered in the 1968 Indianapolis 500 race were powered by T58s. The cars were found to be using variable inlets to get around the USAC regulations on the maximum allowable inlet size and were disqualified.

Turboshaft engines like the GE T58, Lycoming T53/T55 are also used to power high performance powerboats, such as aport and offshore vee, and catamaran hulls like the Skater "Jet Set" or Mystic Powerboats "My Way", water jet river racers like Unnatural Disaster and hydroplanes. Some of these boats run in excess of 200 mph, despite them being open cockpit pleasure boats.

Engines on display
 There is a YT58-GE-2A cutaway on display at the New England Air Museum, Bradley International Airport, Windsor Locks, CT

Specifications (T58-GE-8)

See also

References

 
 GE Aviation T58 page  and T58 history page

External links
Minijets website

T58
1950s turboshaft engines